Johan Henk André Bolhuis (born 4 October 1946) is a retired field hockey player from the Netherlands. He competed  at the 1972 and 1976 Summer Olympics and finished in fourth place in both Games. He was the Olympic flag bearer for the Netherlands in 1976.

In 1969, Bolhuis was selected for the national team, with which he played 128 matches and took part in four World Cups. He won four national titles between 1972 and 1976 and the World Cup in 1973. Playing the world cup final against India in 1973, he dove to stop a critical shot in extra time, allowing the team to win by penalties. His team lost the 1978 World Cup final and ended up with silver medals. He qualified for the 1980 Olympics, but did not compete because of the boycott of the Games by the Netherlands.

The same year, he retired from competitions to become the head coach (1982) and manager (1983–1984) of the national team, and later chef de mission of the Dutch Olympic team at the 1992 and 1996 Summer Olympics. In 1996, he became a Knight of the Order of Orange-Nassau. Between 1998 and 2006, he was president of the Dutch Field Hockey Federation and, since 18 May 2010, he leads the Dutch Olympic Committee NOC*NSF.

Bolhuis is a dentist by profession, with a PhD in tooth injuries in field hockey.

References

External links
 

1946 births
Living people
Dutch male field hockey players
Field hockey players at the 1972 Summer Olympics
Field hockey players at the 1976 Summer Olympics
Olympic field hockey players of the Netherlands
Officers of the Order of Orange-Nassau
People from Zeist
Dutch dentists
SV Kampong players
1978 Men's Hockey World Cup players
Sportspeople from Utrecht (province)
20th-century Dutch people